UoC may refer to:
Unity of Command (video game), 2011 video game
Universitat Oberta de Catalunya
University of Calgary
University of Colombo
University of Cambridge
University of Canterbury
Cardiff University
University of Chester
University of Chichester
University of Cologne
Coventry University
Cranfield University
University of Curaçao
University of Cyberjaya

See also 
UOC